Richard Hill (fl. 10 May 1486; died 20 February 1496) was a medieval Bishop of London.

Hill was Archdeacon of Lewes from 1486, until he was provided as Bishop of London on 21 August 1489 and consecrated on 15 November 1489. He was also appointed Dean of the Chapel Royal.

With a group of supporters around the Court of Arches, including Edward Vaughan, he attempted to undermine the prerogative powers of the Archbishop of Canterbury, at the time John Morton.

Citations

References

Further reading
 Harper-Bill, Christopher Bishop Richard Hill and the court of Canterbury, 1494–96. Guildhall Studies in London History, 3:1 (1977), 1–12.

Year of birth missing
15th-century births
1496 deaths
Archdeacons of Lewes
Deans of the Chapel Royal
Bishops of London
15th-century English Roman Catholic bishops